Heinrich-Wolgast-Preis is a literary prize of Germany.

Recipients

1986: Klas Ewert Everwyn, Achtung Baustelle!
1988: Sven Wernström, Knechte. Malin von Hejpytten
1990: Monika Pelz, Reif für die Insel
1993: Andreas Lettau, Glücksrausch
1996: Susanne Sterzenbach, Alles im Kasten
1999: Gudrun Pausewang, Hörst du den Fluß, Elin?
2002: Virginia Euwer Wolff, Wenn dir das Leben eine Zitrone gibt, mach Limonade draus
2005: Thomas Ahrens, Der Ball ist rund – ein Globalisierungskrimi (Theaterstück)
2008: Gabriele Beyerlein, In Berlin vielleicht
2011: TRICKBOXX des Kinderkanals KI.KA
2013: Sharon Rentta, Doktor Tobis Tierklinik – Ein Tag im Krankenhaus
2015: Ronan de Calan, Donatien Mary, Das Gespenst des Karl Marx, Diaphanes Verlag
2017: Martin Petersen, Exit Sugartown
2019: Wolfgang Korn, Lauf um dein Leben, Hanser Verlag

German literary awards